Justin Andriamanantena (born 25 August 1942) is a Malagasy judoka. He competed in the men's half-middleweight event at the 1972 Summer Olympics.

References

External links

1942 births
Living people
Malagasy male judoka
Olympic judoka of Madagascar
Judoka at the 1972 Summer Olympics
Place of birth missing (living people)